Table tennis at the 2017 Pacific Mini Games in Port Vila, Vanuatu was held on December 4–14, 2017.

Medal summary

Medal table

Men's

Men's Para

Women's

Women's Para

Mixed

Men's tournaments

Team

Preliminary round

Matches

Third place

Final

Women's tournaments

Team

Preliminary round

Matches

See also
 Table tennis at the Pacific Games

References

2017 Pacific Mini Games
2017
Pacific Mini Games